Marco & Seba, previously known as Play & Win are a Romanian singer-songwriter and music production duo formed in 2000 by Radu Bolfea, Marcel Botezan and Sebastian Barac. Since then, they have been making music without Bolfea. They are a leading production team having more than 500 songs to their credit registered at the PRS. As Play & Win, they have been produced some of Romania's biggest dance music hits, collaborating with artists including Inna, Akcent, 3rei Sud Est, and Cătălin Josan. As a musical group, they have released numerous singles that have charted on various music charts.

History

Play & Win was formed in 2000 by Radu Bolfea, Marcel Botezan, and Sebastian Barac, all of whom are from Alba Iulia, a city in the Transylvania region of Romania. Throughout their career, the trio has collaborated with Activ, creating hits like "Superstar", "Dor", "Heaven" and "Lucruri Simple". Other collaborations include 3rei Sud Est's Alături de Îngeri, Sistem's Oare unde eşti, Andra's We Go Crazy, and Inna's House Music. Their production debut came in 2005 with the single Kylie for the Romanian band Akcent. The song peaked in the top 5 of music charts in Belgium, Sweden, Norway, Poland, Russia, Ukraine, and Turkey as well as No. 1 on Netherlands, Finland and Romanian charts.<ref>{{cite web|url=http://www.musicxpress.ro/noutate/681/intreaga-europa-danseaza-pe-ritmul-piesei-kylie/|title=Intreaga Europa danseaza pe ritmul piesei 'Kylie|date=1 February 2006|publisher=www.musicxpress.ro|language=ro|access-date=29 July 2009}}</ref>
Play & Win produced Inna's first album Hot, released initially in 2009. The album included the single Hot which made Inna the first Romanian artist to top a Billboard chart in the United States when it reached No. 1 on Billboard's Dance/Mix Show Airplay chart. The album also featured charted singles Love, Déjà Vu, Amazing and 10 Minutes, all of which were written and produced by Play & Win. The singles Hot and Love from the album received more than 50 million views on YouTube in the first year of their release. Play & Win also produced I Am the Club Rocker, INNA's second studio album released in 2011. The album was certified Gold in both Romania and Poland and was described by Play & Win as their best record so far. The album contained the single Sun Is Up which peaked at No. 1 in Bulgaria and No. 5 on the UK Dance Chart.

Play & Win is also attributed with composing Zero's Sunny Days, a single that came second in the Romanian National Eurovision Song Contest in 2009. They also produced Morris' Desire which reached No. 5 on the Fresh Top 40. Play & Win have also collaborated with Andreea Bănică, producing her No. 1 single Sexy in 2010.

Play & Win made their chart debut as singers in 2009 with the single Slow Motion. It became one of the biggest hits in Romania in the spring of 2009, reaching No. 1 on the Kiss FM Fresh Top 40. Their single Ya BB'' was another chart success in Romania, reaching No. 1 on the official Romanian Top 100 on 5 June 2011. It was the most broadcast song on Romanian radio for 16 weeks. They were featured in the song Inndia, a single from INNA's third studio album, also produced by the trio. The song was written by Play & Win and released to Romanian mainstream radio stations on 28 June 2012. Music produced by Play & Win for INNA reached more than 1 billion views on YouTube and each INNA's single had more than 15 mil. views and more than 500.000 sales on album.

They have since been making music as Marco & Seba, without Radu Bolfea.

Discography

As Play & Win

Albums

Singles

Music production

References

External links 
 

Romanian musical groups